Pripek Point (‘Nos Pripek’ \'nos 'pri-pek\) is the point forming the west side of the entrance to Dimitrov Cove on the northwest coast of Velingrad Peninsula on Graham Coast in Graham Land, Antarctica.

The point is named after the settlements of Pripek in Northeastern, Southeastern and Southern Bulgaria, and Dalgi (Long) Pripek in Northern Bulgaria.

Location
British mapping in 1971.

Maps
 British Antarctic Territory.  Scale 1:200000 topographic map. DOS 610 Series, Sheet W 65 64.  Directorate of Overseas Surveys, Tolworth, UK, 1971.
 Antarctic Digital Database (ADD). Scale 1:250000 topographic map of Antarctica. Scientific Committee on Antarctic Research (SCAR). Since 1993, regularly upgraded and updated.

References
 Pripek Point. SCAR Composite Antarctic Gazetteer
 Bulgarian Antarctic Gazetteer. Antarctic Place-names Commission. (details in Bulgarian, basic data in English)

External links
 Pripek Point. Copernix satellite image

Headlands of Graham Land
Bulgaria and the Antarctic
Graham Coast